Honoured Society is a name given to several criminal organisations often of Italian origin.

Sicilian Mafia
'Ndrangheta
Honoured Society (Australia)
For The Honoured Society, a 1964 nonfiction book about the Mafia, see Norman Lewis